The Punjabi diaspora (pajābī pravāsī) refers to the descendants of ethnic Punjabis who emigrated out of the Punjab region in the northern part of the Indian subcontinent to the rest of the world. Punjabis are one of the largest ethnic groups in both the Pakistani and Indian diasporas. The Punjabi diaspora numbers around the world has been given between 2.5 and 10 million, mainly concentrated in Britain, Canada, United States, Western Europe, Southeast Asia, the Middle East, Australia and New Zealand.

Afghanistan

Bangladesh
Many families from Punjab, Pakistan migrated to erstwhile East Pakistan (present-day Bangladesh) as it was one country at the time. Some of these families chose to remain in Bangladesh after its independence. One such example is the family of Bangladeshi-Punjabi cricketer Junaid Siddique.

Australia

Punjabis migrated to Australia from other parts of the Punjabi diaspora, as well from the state of Punjab itself. The Majority were Sikh and Hindu Punjabis are the minority.

Canada

85% of Indo-Canadians in British Columbia are Punjabi Sikhs, including former premier of British Columbia, Ujjal Dosanjh.

Germany
The Punjabi Sikh diaspora in Germany is around 15,000-21,000.

Georgia
In 2012 around 2000 farmers from Punjab, India migrated to Georgia to do farming . As of 2018 around 200 out of them are still living there in Tsnori, a town in Kakheti region.

Hong Kong
Among Hong Kong Indian adolescents, Punjabi is the third  most common language other than Cantonese. The Punjabis were influential in the military, and in line with the British military thinking of the time (namely, the late 19th century and early 20th century) Punjabi Sikhs, Punjabi Hindus and Punjabi Muslims formed two separate regiments. The regiments were as follows:

Punjab regiment: 25,000 soldiers (50% Muslim, 40% Hindu and 10% Sikh)
Sikh Regiment: 10,000 soldiers (80% Sikh, 20% Hindu)

In 1939, Hong Kong's police force included 272 Europeans, 774 Indians (mainly Punjabis) and 1140 Chinese. Punjabis dominated Hong Kong's police force until the 1950s.

From the 2006 Government by-census results, it shows a population of roughly 20,444 Indians and roughly 11,111 Pakistanis residing at the former British territory.

Iran
Around 60 Punjabi Sikh families resides in Iran. Punjabi language is also taught at Kendriya Vidyalaya Tehran, an Indian co-educational school in Baharestan District, Tehran.

Japan
There are 71,000 Punjabis. In Japan 98% of the Punjabis are Sikh and 1.5% of the Punjabis are Christian.

Kenya
Most Kenyan Asians are Gujaratis, but the second largest group are Punjabis. All three major religious groups (Sikh, Muslim and Hindu) are represented in the Punjabi population. The artisan Ramgharia caste used to be the largest group amongst the Sikhs.

Malaysia
Although most Malaysian Indians are Tamils, there were also many Punjabis that immigrated to Malaysia. They are known to be the third largest Indian ethnic group in Malaysia, after the Tamils and Malayalees. According to Amarjit Kaur as of 1993 there were 60, 000 Punjabis in Malaysia. Robin Cohen estimates the number of Malaysian Sikhs as 30, 000 (as of 1995). Recent figures state that there are 130,000 Sikhs in Malaysia.

New Zealand

In New Zealand, Punjabis are one of the largest group of Indian New Zealanders.

Persian Gulf states

In the Gulf states, the largest group among Pakistani expatriates are the Punjabis.

Indonesia
Punjabis are the second largest Indian group in Indonesia, right after Tamil people, some of them are known as film producer, politician and athlete such as Manoj Punjabi, H. S. Dillon, Gurnam Singh, Ayu Azhari, and Musa Rajekshah. Punjabis in Indonesia are majority following Sikhism or Islam, according to some source, the population of Punjabi are estimate about 35,000 to 60,000.

Philippines
The Philippines has over 50,000 Punjabi Indians as recently as the year 2016, not including illegal Punjabi Indian immigrants. This makes the Philippines having the 6th highest population of Punjabi Indians in the world.

Singapore
The third largest group among Indo-Singaporeans in 1980 were Punjabis (after Tamils - who form a majority of Indo-Singaporeans - and Malayalis), at 7.8% of the Indo-Singaporean population.

Thailand
Most Indians in Thailand are Punjabis.

United Kingdom

In the United Kingdom, around two-thirds of direct migrants (excluding South Asians that immigrated from the Caribbean, Fiji and other regions) from South Asia were Punjabi.  The remaining third is mostly Gujarati and Bengali. They form a majority of both the South Asian British Sikh and Hindu communities.

Most "twice-migrants" - a term describing South Asian descendants who migrated to the United Kingdom not directly from South Asia (mainly from the Indian diaspora in Southeast Africa and other British Colonies) were also Punjabi or Gujarati.

United Kingdom is also known as the birthplace of bhangra music, a style of non traditional Punjabi music created by the Punjabi diaspora.

United States

The earliest South Asian immigrants to the United States were Punjabis, who mostly immigrated to the West Coast, particularly California. Half of Pakistani Americans are Punjabis. 85% of the early Indian immigrants to the US were Sikhs, although they were incorrectly branded by White Americans as "Hindus". 90% of Indians who settled in the Central Valley of California were Punjabi Sikhs.

See also 

 Sikh diaspora

References

 
Punjab
Pakistani diaspora
Ethnic groups in India
Social groups of Pakistan